Sassia semitorta is a species of predatory sea snail, a marine gastropod mollusk in the family Cymatiidae.

Description

Distribution
This species occurs in China Seas.

References

 Liu, J.Y. [Ruiyu] (ed.). (2008). Checklist of marine biota of China seas. China Science Press. 1267 pp.

Cymatiidae
Gastropods described in 1961